Gavin Fletcher (born 30 October 1941) is a Scottish former professional footballer who played as an inside forward.

Career
Born in Bellshill, Fletcher played for Shotts Bon Accord, Partick Thistle, Third Lanark, Bradford City, Stranraer and Whitburn Junior.

References

1941 births
Living people
Scottish footballers
Shotts Bon Accord F.C. players
Partick Thistle F.C. players
Third Lanark A.C. players
Bradford City A.F.C. players
Stranraer F.C. players
Whitburn Junior F.C. players
Scottish Football League players
English Football League players
Association football inside forwards
Footballers from Bellshill